Vinderød Parish was a parish in the Diocese of Helsingør in Halsnæs Municipality, Denmark. The satellite town of Vinderød was in the parish. The parish was merged with Frederiksværk Parish on 1 July 2014 to form Frederiksværk-Vinderød Parish.

References 

Halsnæs Municipality
Parishes of Denmark